Uwe Jähnig (born 26 August 1969) is a German former professional footballer who played as a midfielder. He played for Dynamo Dresden in the DDR-Oberliga and the Bundesliga, before joining Hamburger SV in 1995, along with team-mate Sven Kmetsch. He was forced to retire in 1997, due to injury.

References

External links
 

1969 births
Living people
Footballers from Dresden
German footballers
East German footballers
Association football midfielders
Germany under-21 international footballers
Dynamo Dresden players
Dynamo Dresden II players
1. FC Magdeburg players
Hamburger SV players
Bundesliga players
DDR-Oberliga players